E adesso sesso (And now sex) is a 2001 Italian anthology comedy film written and directed by Carlo Vanzina. It consists of eight segments, set in different Italian cities, all sharing sex as main theme.

Plot 
In Italy there's the 2000s, bringing fresh air. In several episodes, Carlo Vanzina offers a glimpse of the typical behavior of the Italian character of the middle-class who is struggling with beautiful women, betrayal, love affairs, and much more.

Cast  
Elena Russo: Assunta Potito 
Adolfo Margiotta: Romeo
Youma Diakite: Brigitte 
Antonello Fassari: Padre di Barbara
Emanuela Rossi: Madre di Barbara	
Virginie Marsan: Barbara
Alessio Modica: Matteo
Luigi Maria Burruano: Barone
Tony Sperandeo: Don Calogero
Guia Jelo: Anna 
Max Giusti: Cesare
Anna Longhi: Nonna di Cesare  
Éva Henger: Spogliarellista alla finestra
Francesca Nunzi: Adalgisa
Angelo Russo: Antonio 
Paolo Triestino: Isidoro
Antonio Allocca: Doorman

References

External links

2001 films
Commedia sexy all'italiana
2000s sex comedy films
Films directed by Carlo Vanzina
Films set in Sardinia
Films set in Sicily
2000s Italian-language films
2000s Italian films